Luis Germán Florido Barreto (born September 18, 1966) is a Venezuelan politician who currently serves as National Assembly deputy representing Lara for the Voluntad Popular political party. He was president of the Foreign Policy Commission of the National Assembly from 2016 to 2018.

On October 26, 2018, the Prime Minister of Spain, Pedro Sánchez, in a meeting with the Council of Ministers, granted him Spanish citizenship.

References 

1966 births
Living people
People from Lara (state)
Popular Will politicians
People of the Crisis in Venezuela
Members of the National Assembly (Venezuela)
People from Barquisimeto